Kazeem Manzur (born 8 July 1991, in Milton Keynes, England) is a professional British racecar driver, who races for Josef Kaufmann Racing in the Formula BMW Europe series. In 2008, Manzur became the first ever British-Asian racing driver to compete on the undercard of an FIA Formula One World Championship event and he scored a podium finish at just his second single-seater event in a Formula BMW race at the Sepang International Circuit, Malaysia.

Karting 
Prior to racing single-seater cars, Manzur competed at the highest level of international karting competition, racing in the CIK-FIA sanctioned KF1 category in 2007. He is the youngest ever driver to stand on the podium of a KF1 event and a former winner of the Pomposa Cup.

Personal life
Hobbies: karting, football, music
Favourite driver: Kimi Räikkönen
Favourite circuit: Circuit de Spa-Francorchamps

References

External links 
 
 

1991 births
Living people
English racing drivers
Formula BMW Europe drivers

Josef Kaufmann Racing drivers